Eagle Mountain is a mountain located in Ulster County, New York. 
The mountain is part of the Catskill Mountains.
Eagle Mountain is flanked to the north by Haynes Mountain, to the southwest by Doubletop Mountain and Graham Mountain, and to the southeast by Big Indian Mountain.

The east and northeast sides of Eagle Mountain drain into Esopus Creek, thence into the Hudson River, which drains into New York Bay. 
The north, west and south sides of Eagle Mtn. drain into Dry Brook, thence into the East Branch of the Delaware River, and into Delaware Bay. 

Eagle Mountain is within the Big Indian Wilderness of New York's Catskill State Park.

Notes

See also 
 List of mountains in New York

External links 
  
 
  Catskill 3500: Eagle Mountain

Mountains of Ulster County, New York
Mountains of New York (state)
Catskill High Peaks